Donald Ewan Montgomery (1896–1957) was an American economist who served in the U.S. Department of Agriculture (USDA) during the New Deal, and later was a labor activist for the United Automobile Workers (UAW).

Background

Montgomery was born on October 16, 1896.

In 1918, he earned a BA from the University of Pennsylvania. He pursued graduate study at the University of Wisconsin.

Career

Montgomery served as Director of the Registration Division of the U.S. Securities and Exchange Commission (SEC).

In September 1935, he resigned from the SEC to become "Consumer Counsel" at USDA. During 1942, Montgomery appeared on Labor for Victory, a 15-minute weekly radio show on NBC, created by the AFL and CIO. The episode also included the CIO's director of publicity, Len De Caux.

  In December 1942, he left USDA.

In February 1943, he again became "Consumer Counsel," this time for the UAW. Walter Reuther was recruiting professionals for various UAW branch offices and included Montgomery, a liberal economist and professional in New Deal laws and regulations. He served as UAW representative on the Policy Committee of Price Administration. In 1947, when the UAW's Washington Office Policy Committee reorganized, Reuther appointed Montgomery as director.  He served in that capacity until his death.

Historian Irving Richter calls Montgomery a "close advisor" of Reuther's, who even ghost-wrote matters for the UAW president.

Personal and death
Montgomery served as an ensign in the U.S. Navy during World War I. In 1920, he married Sarah Victorine Adamson (1898–1987) of Cedartown, Georgia. They had three children, Donald Jr., Charles and Margaret, and were living in Washington, D.C. in 1940. The couple divorced in 1951.

Montgomery died on October 11, 1957. Newspapers reported the cause of death as suicide: "He killed himself at home yesterday after telephoning police."

References

External sources
 
 
 ILWU Dispatcher image of Montgomery (1943)
 

1896 births
1957 deaths
Franklin D. Roosevelt administration personnel
20th-century American economists
University of Pennsylvania alumni
University of Wisconsin–Madison alumni
1957 suicides
Suicides by firearm in Pennsylvania